Seacon Development Co. Ltd is a Bangkok based retail and development company. The company is best known for managing Seacon Square Srinakarin & Seacon Square Bangkae, two large shopping malls in Bangkok, Thailand.

Real estate companies of Thailand
Companies based in Bangkok